In economics, "rational expectations" are model-consistent expectations, in that agents inside the model are assumed to "know the model" and on average take the model's predictions as valid. Rational expectations ensure internal consistency in models involving uncertainty. To obtain consistency within a model, the predictions of future values of economically relevant variables from the model are assumed to be the same as that of the decision-makers in the model, given their information set, the nature of the random processes involved, and model structure. The rational expectations assumption is used especially in many contemporary macroeconomic models.

Since most macroeconomic models today study decisions under uncertainty and over many periods, the expectations of individuals, firms, and government institutions about future economic conditions are an essential part of the model. To assume rational expectations is to assume that agents' expectations may be wrong, but are correct on average over time. In other words, although the future is not fully predictable, agents' expectations are assumed not to be systematically biased and collectively use all relevant information in forming expectations of economic variables. This way of modeling expectations was originally proposed by John F. Muth (1961) and later became influential when it was used by Robert Lucas Jr. in macroeconomics.

Deirdre McCloskey emphasizes that "rational expectations" is an expression of intellectual modesty:

Hence, it is important to distinguish the rational-expectations assumption from assumptions of individual rationality and to note that the first does not imply the latter. Rational expectations is an assumption of aggregate consistency in dynamic models. In contrast, rational choice theory studies individual decision making and is used extensively in, among others, game theory and contract theory. In fact, Muth cited survey data exhibiting "considerable cross-sectional differences of opinion" and was quite explicit in stating that his rational-expectations hypothesis does not assert... that predictions of entrepreneurs are perfect or that their expectations are all the same. In Muth's version of rational expectations, each individual holds beliefs that are model inconsistent, although the distribution of these diverse beliefs is unbiased relative to the data generated by the actions resulting from these expectations.

Theory
Rational expectations theory defines this kind of expectations as being the best guess of the future (the optimal forecast) that uses all available information. Thus, it is assumed that outcomes that are being forecast do not differ systematically from the market equilibrium results. As a result, rational expectations do not differ systematically or predictably from equilibrium results.  That is, it assumes that people do not make systematic errors when predicting the future, and deviations from perfect foresight are only random.  In an economic model, this is typically modelled by assuming that the expected value of a variable is equal to the expected value predicted by the model.

For example, suppose that P is the equilibrium price in a simple market, determined by supply and demand. The theory of rational expectations says that the actual price will only deviate from the expectation if there is an 'information shock' caused by information unforeseeable at the time expectations were formed. In other words, ex ante the price is anticipated to equal its rational expectation:

Mathematical derivation 
If rational expectations are applied to the Phillips curve analysis, the distinction between long and short term will be completely negated, that is, there is no Phillips curve, and there is no substitute relationship between inflation rate and unemployment rate that can be utilized.

The mathematical derivation is as follows:

Rational expectation is consistent with objective mathematical expectation: 

Mathematical derivation (1)

Assuming that the actual process is known, the rate of inflation depends on previous monetary changes and changes in short-term variables such as X (for example, oil prices):

(1) 

(2) 

(3)  , 

(4) 

(5) 

Thus, even in the short run, there is no substitute relationship between inflation and unemployment. Random shocks, which are completely unpredictable, are the only reason why the unemployment rate deviates from the natural rate.

Mathematical derivation (2)

Even if the actual rate of inflation is dependent on current monetary changes, the public can make rational expectations as long as they know how monetary policy is being decided:

(1) 

(2) 

(3) 

(4) 

(5) 

The conclusion is essentially the same: random shocks that are completely unpredictable are the only thing that can cause the unemployment rate to deviate from the natural rate.

Implications

Rational expectations theories were developed in response to perceived flaws in theories based on adaptive expectations.  Under adaptive expectations, expectations of the future value of an economic variable are based on past values.  For example, people would be assumed to predict inflation by looking at inflation last year and in previous years.  Under adaptive expectations, if the economy suffers from constantly rising inflation rates (perhaps due to government policies), people would be assumed to always underestimate inflation. Many economists have regarded this as unrealistic, believing that rational individuals would sooner or later realize the trend and take it into account in forming their expectations.

The rational expectations hypothesis has been used to support some strong conclusions about economic policymaking. An example is the policy ineffectiveness proposition developed by Thomas Sargent and Neil Wallace. If the Federal Reserve attempts to lower unemployment through expansionary monetary policy economic agents will anticipate the effects of the change of policy and raise their expectations of future inflation accordingly. This in turn will counteract the expansionary effect of the increased money supply. All that the government can do is raise the inflation rate, not employment. This is a distinctly New Classical outcome. During the 1970s rational expectations appeared to have made previous macroeconomic theory largely obsolete, which culminated with the Lucas critique. However, rational expectations theory has been widely adopted and is considered an innocuous assumption in macroeconomics.

If agents do not (or cannot) form rational expectations or if prices are not completely flexible, discretional and completely anticipated economic policy actions can trigger real changes.

Criticism 
Rational expectations are expected values in the mathematical sense. In order to be able to compute expected values, individuals must know the true economic model, its parameters, and the nature of the stochastic processes that govern its evolution. If these extreme assumptions are violated, individuals simply cannot form rational expectations.

Testing empirically for rational expectations

Suppose we have data on inflationary expectations, such as that from the Michigan survey. We can test whether these expectations are rational by regressing the actual realized inflation rate  on the prior expectation of it, X, at some specified lead time k:

We can test the rationality of expectations by testing the joint null hypothesis that

failure to reject this null hypothesis is evidence in favor of rational expectations. A stronger test can be conducted if the one above has failed to reject the null: the residuals of the above regression can themselves be regressed on other variables whose values are available to agents when they are forming the expectation. If any of these variables has a significant effect on the residuals, agents can be said to have failed to take them sufficiently into account when forming their expectations, leading to needlessly high variance of the forecasting residuals and thus more uncertainty than is necessary about their predictions, which hampers their effort to use the predictions in their economic choices for things such as money demand, consumption, fixed investment, etc.

See also 

 Adaptive expectations
 Behavioral economics
 Dynamic stochastic general equilibrium
 Factors of production
 Game theory
 Market price
 Lucas aggregate supply function
 Lucas critique
 Lucas island model
 Rationality

Notes

References 
 Hanish C. Lodhia (2005) "The Irrationality of Rational Expectations – An Exploration into Economic Fallacy". 1st Edition, Warwick University Press, UK.
 Maarten C. W. Janssen (1993) "Microfoundations: A Critical Inquiry". Routledge.
 John F. Muth  (1961) "Rational Expectations and the Theory of Price Movements" reprinted in The new classical macroeconomics. Volume 1. (1992): 3–23 (International Library of Critical Writings in Economics, vol. 19. Aldershot, UK: Elgar.)
 Thomas J. Sargent (1987). "Rational expectations," The New Palgrave: A Dictionary of Economics, v. 4, pp. 76–79.
 N.E. Savin (1987). "Rational expectations: econometric implications," The New Palgrave: A Dictionary of Economics, v. 4, pp. 79–85.

External links 

 

New classical macroeconomics